Peduim (lit. Ransomed) is a moshav in southern Israel. Located in the north-western Negev near Ofakim, it falls under the jurisdiction of Merhavim Regional Council.

History
The moshav was established in 1950 by immigrants from Yemen. Like several other moshavim in the area, its name is taken from the Book of Isaiah 35:10;
And the ransomed of the LORD shall return, and come with singing unto Zion, and everlasting joy shall be upon their heads; they shall obtain gladness and joy, and sorrow and sighing shall flee away.

References

Moshavim
Populated places established in 1950
Populated places in Southern District (Israel)
Yemeni-Jewish culture in Israel
1950 establishments in Israel